British United Traction (BUT) was a manufacturer of railway equipment and trolleybuses. It was established in 1946 as a joint venture between AEC and Leyland.

History

British United Traction was established in 1946 when AEC and Leyland amalgamated their trolleybus interests. Neither had produced trolleybuses since early years of World War II. With both forecasting that demand would return to pre-war levels as networks began to close, a joint venture was formed. The new company was organised so that AEC would design and produce vehicles for the UK market while Leyland looked after export markets, although there were some exceptions to this. The only noticeable difference between the manufacturers output was the wheels.

Initially vehicles were produced at Leyland's Ham, London factory, with the first vehicles completed in 1947 for Johannesburg. After the factory closed 1948, production moved to AEC's Southall and Leyland's Leyland, Lancashire factories. Following AEC's acquisition of Crossley Motors, AEC transferred its production to the latter's Stockport factory. Trolleybus production wound down in the late 1950s, however a final batch for Wellington was built at Scammell's, Watford factory in 1964.

Trolleybuses
9611T
9612T
9613T
9641T
RETB1 / LETB1

Diesel engines for railways

British United Traction was a major supplier of diesel engines for British Rail's first-generation diesel multiple units.

A  version was supplied to the Ulster Transport Authority for its UTA MPD class railcar.

References

External links

Associated Equipment Company
 
Defunct bus manufacturers of the United Kingdom
Electric vehicle manufacturers of the United Kingdom
Leyland Motors
Trolleybus manufacturers
Vehicle manufacturing companies established in 1946
1946 establishments in England